Humiston is a surname. Notable people with the surname include:

Amos Humiston (1830–1863), American soldier
Mary Grace Quackenbos Humiston (1869–1948), first female Special Assistant United States Attorney
Mike Humiston (born 1959), American football linebacker